HD 79498 is a primary of the star system located  159 light years away in the constellation Cancer. This G5 main sequence star has an apparent magnitude of 8.0 and is about the same size and mass as the Sun. It has a higher than solar abundance of elements other than hydrogen and helium; what astronomers term a metal-rich star. 

The secondary star of the star system is the BD+23 2063 B located on the projected separation of the 2900 AU from the primary. It is a red dwarf of spectral class M0.

Planetary system
The McDonald Observatory planet search program discovered planet orbiting primary in 2011 using radial velocity method.

See also
List of stars in Cancer

References

Cancer (constellation)
Planetary systems with one confirmed planet
G-type main-sequence stars
Binary stars
Durchmusterung objects
079498
045406
J09150941+2322323